The Durham Chancery Act 1869 (32 & 33 Vict c 84) was an Act of the Parliament of the United Kingdom. It was one of the Durham County Palatine Acts 1836 to 1889.

Preamble and words of enactment
The preamble, and the following words to "same as follows" were repealed by section 1 of, and Schedule 1 to, the Statute Law Revision (No. 2) Act 1893.

Section 1
In this section, the words "from and after the passing of this Act", in both places they occurred, were repealed by section 1 of, and Schedule 1 to, the Statute Law Revision (No. 2) Act 1893.

References
Halsbury's Statutes,
Council of Law Reporting. The Law Reports. The Public General Statutes, with a list of the local and private Acts, passed in the thirty-second and thirty-third years of the reign of Her Majesty Queen Victoria. London. 1869. Pages 485 and 486. Digitised copy from Google Books.

United Kingdom Acts of Parliament 1869